Enrique Ángel Saravia Hernández (born April 23, 1967 in Montevideo, Uruguay) is a former Uruguayan footballer who played for clubs of Uruguay, Argentina, Chile, Paraguay and Ecuador .

Teams
  Nacional 1988-1989
  Liga Deportiva Universitaria de Quito 1989
  Nacional 1990-1992
  Deportivo Mandiyú 1992-1993
  Nacional 1993
  Defensor Sporting 1994
  Olimpia 1995
  Rampla Juniors 1995-1996
  Cerro 1996
  Everton 1998
  Rentistas 1999
  Rocha 2000-2001
  Colón 2001-2003

References
 Profile at BDFA 
 

1967 births
Living people
Uruguayan people of Portuguese descent
Uruguayan footballers
Uruguayan expatriate footballers
Club Nacional de Football players
Defensor Sporting players
Rampla Juniors players
C.A. Rentistas players
Rocha F.C. players
Colón F.C. players
C.A. Cerro players
Deportivo Mandiyú footballers
Everton de Viña del Mar footballers
L.D.U. Quito footballers
Primera B de Chile players
Argentine Primera División players
Expatriate footballers in Chile
Expatriate footballers in Argentina
Expatriate footballers in Paraguay
Expatriate footballers in Ecuador
Uruguayan expatriate sportspeople in Ecuador
Association footballers not categorized by position